The 2007 TT Pro League was the ninth season of the TT Pro League, the Trinidad and Tobago professional league for association football clubs, since its establishment in 1999. A total of ten teams took part in the league, with Joe Public the defending champions. The season began on 14 April and ended on 18 December, with the conclusion of the Lucozade Sport Big Six.

Changes from the 2006 season 
The following changes were made since the 2006 season:
 The reserve league was established to provide valuable playing time to develop non-starters on team rosters with a league of their own to show scouts their skills on the field.
 There were a number of changes to the clubs competing in the 2007 season.
 South Starworld Strikers, based in San Fernando, withdrew from the league following the 2006 season.
 Police, were admitted back into the Pro League following their absence since 2001.

Teams

Team summaries 

Note: Flags indicate national team as has been defined under FIFA eligibility rules. Players may hold more than one non-FIFA nationality.

Managerial changes

Regular season

Competition table

Results

Matches 1–18

Matches 19–27

Lucozade Sport Big Six

Competition table

Results

League table

Positions by round

Season statistics

Scoring 
 First goal of the season: Nigel Codrington for Caledonia AIA against San Juan Jabloteh, (14 April 2007).
 Last goal of the season: Conrad Smith for Caledonia AIA against San Juan Jabloteh, (18 December 2007).
 First own goal of the season: Michael Edwards (Defence Force) for Joe Public, (25 August 2007).
 First penalty kick of the season: Kareem Joseph (scored) for Caledonia AIA against Tobago United (26 June 2007).
 First hat-trick of the season: Kendall Jagdeosingh (North East Stars) against Tobago United, 56', 59', 87' (14 April 2007).
 Most goals scored by one player in a match: 3 goals
 Kendall Jagdeosingh (North East Stars) against Tobago United, 56', 59', 87' (14 April 2007).
 Errol McFarlane (Superstar Rangers) against Tobago United, 42', 81', 82' (17 April 2007).
 Peter Byers (San Juan Jabloteh) against Tobago United), 17', 35', 45' (3 July 2007).
 Errol McFarlane (Superstar Rangers) against Police, 34', 42', 75' (8 July 2007).
 Peter Prospar (United Petrotrin) against Police, 51', 61', 68' (10 July 2007).
 Kayode Legall (Tobago United) against Police, 62', 75', 90' (31 July 2007).
 Hayden Tinto (Caledonia AIA) against Tobago United, 56', 59', 70' (30 October 2007).
 Widest winning margin: 7 goals
 W Connection 7–0 Police (15 September 2007)
 Most goals in a match: 8 goals
 Tobago United 6–2 Police (31 July 2007)
 Tobago United 1–7 Caledonia AIA (30 October 2007)
 North East Stars 7–1 Police (13 November 2007)
 Most goals in one half: 6 goals
 Tobago United v San Juan Jabloteh (3 July 2007) 1–5 at half-time, 1–5 final.
 Police v W Connection (28 July 2007) 1–0 at half-time, 4–3 final.
 Tobago United v Police (31 July 2007) 2–0 at half-time, 6–2 final.
 Tobago United v Joe Public (15 September 2007) 0–0 at half-time, 1–5 final.
 North East Stars v Police (13 November 2007) 2–0 at half-time, 7–1 final.
 Most goals in one half by a single team: 5 goals
 Tobago United v San Juan Jabloteh (3 July 2007) 1–5 at half-time, 1–5 final.
 Tobago United v Joe Public (15 September 2007) 0–0 at half-time, 1–5 final.
 W Connection v Police (15 September 2007) 2–0 at half-time, 7–0 final.
 Tobago United v Caledonia AIA (30 October 2007) 1–2 at half-time, 1–7 final.
 North East Stars v Police (13 November 2007) 2–0 at half-time, 7–1 final.

Top scorers

Hat-tricks 

 * Home team score first in result

Awards

Round awards

Annual awards 
The 2007 TT Pro League awards distribution took place on 5 April 2008, prior to the 2008 season's opening match at Hasely Crawford Stadium.

The majority of the individual and team awards were shared by the league champion, San Juan Jabloteh, and the league's top trophy winner, W Connection. Marvin Oliver of Caledonia AIA was named the league's Player of the Year and Best Midfielder for the season. Each being Oliver's first recognition of his career. Peter Byers from Antigua and Barbuda received the Golden Boot and was named the Best Forward for leading the league with 15 goals. Stuart Charles-Fevrier became the first two-time winner of Manager of the Year after leading W Connection to two more cup trophies, a league third-place finish, and the Team of the Year award. Other individual awards were received by Jabloteh's Cleon John and W Connection's Elijah Joseph for Best Goalkeeper and Best Defender, respectively. The remaining team award was also won by the Savonetta Boys for the Most Disciplined Team of the Year. FIFA international referee, Neal Brizan, won the Referee of the Year, whereas Norris Ferguson won the Match Commissioner of the Year.

References

External links 
 Official Website
 Soca Warriors Online, TT Pro League

TT Pro League seasons
1
Trinidad
Trinidad